Shuyukh Tahtani Subdistrict  is a subdistrict of Ayn al-Arab District in Aleppo Governorate of northern Syria. Administrative centre is Shuyukh Tahtani.

At the 2004 census, the subdistrict had a population of 43,861.

Cities, towns and villages

References 

Ayn al-Arab District
Shuyukh Tahtani